Labour Standards (Non-Metropolitan Territories) Convention, 1947 is  an International Labour Organization Convention.

It was established in 1947 with the preamble stating:
Having decided upon the adoption of certain proposals concerning the application of international labour standards in non-metropolitan territories,...

Ratifications
The treaty has been ratified only by the United Kingdom in 1950 and Australia in 1973. Australia has subsequently denounced the treaty, making it currently in force only for the United Kingdom.

External links 
Ratifications.

International Labour Organization conventions
Treaties concluded in 1947
Treaties entered into force in 1974
Treaties of the United Kingdom
1947 in labor relations